State Route 224 (SR 224) is a state highway located in the city of Sanford in extreme southern Maine.  Running entirely within the village of Springvale, the route begins at State Route 11, State Route 11A, and State Route 109 just west of downtown Sanford, and terminates at U.S. Route 202 and State Route 4A east of town.  SR 224 functions as a northern bypass of downtown Sanford, running along the Mousam River for most of its length.

Route description 
SR 224 begins in Sanford at the intersection of SR 11 / SR 109 (Main Street), Oak Street, and Bridge Street.  Bridge Street carries the initial stretch of SR 224; west of Main Street, the road continues southwest on Oak Street as SR 11A.  SR 224 heads northeast on Bridge Street, crosses the Mousam River, then immediately turns southeast onto Pleasant Street.  The highway runs along the northern side of the river, passing several churches, housing developments, and shops in Springvale.  As SR 224 crosses River Street passes Carl J. Lamb Elementary School, the road becomes Shaws Ridge Road.  The highway turns northeast, then again southeast and terminates at US 202 / SR 4A (Sanford Road) near the Alfred town line.

History 
The SR 224 designation was first used on a route between Dexter and Guilford, which was renumbered in 1933 as SR 24 and exists now as the northernmost stretch of SR 23.

The modern SR 224 was designated in 1933 covering the current routing in Springvale and cosigned with SR 4 (modern US 202 / SR 4A) east to Alfred where it terminated at SR 111.  In 1939, the concurrency was eliminated and the route was truncated to its modern terminus.  Its alignment has not changed since.

Major junctions

References

External links

Maine State Route Log via floodgap.com

224
Transportation in York County, Maine